1 Kings 7 is the seventh chapter of the Books of Kings in the Hebrew Bible or the First Book of Kings in the Old Testament of the Christian Bible. The book is a compilation of various annals recording the acts of the kings of Israel and Judah by a Deuteronomic compiler in the seventh century BCE, with a supplement added in the sixth century BCE. This chapter belongs to the section focusing on the reign of Solomon over the unified kingdom of Judah and Israel (1 Kings 1 to 11). The focus of this chapter is the reign of Solomon, the king of Israel.

Text
This chapter was originally written in the Hebrew language and since the 16th century is divided into 51 verses.

Textual witnesses
Some early manuscripts containing the text of this chapter in Hebrew are of the Masoretic Text tradition, which includes the Codex Cairensis (895), Aleppo Codex (10th century), and Codex Leningradensis (1008). Fragments containing parts of this chapter in Hebrew were found among the Dead Sea Scrolls, that is, 4Q54 (4QKings; 50–25 BCE) with extant verses 20–21, 25–27, 29–42, 51.

There is also a translation into Koine Greek known as the Septuagint, made in the last few centuries BCE. Extant ancient manuscripts of the Septuagint version include Codex Vaticanus (B; B; 4th century) and Codex Alexandrinus (A; A; 5th century).

Old Testament references
: 
: 
: 
: 
:

Analysis
1 Kings 6 to 7 cover the building of the temple, with insertions of information about Solomon's palace, the "house of the forest of Lebanon", the hall of the throne, the hall of judgment, and a house for Pharaoh's daughter (1 Kings 7:1–12).

Construction of the palace (7:1–12)
The temple was actually integrated into a larger complex of government buildings, by itself is comparable to a palace chapel. Other buildings were larger and taken in all almost twice as long to build than the Temple alone (13 years vs. 7 years), but seems to share similar architectural style and material. The monumental 'House of the Forest of the Lebanon' was apparently named for its richly crafted and precious Lebanese timber, measuring roughly 50x25 meter with 45 pillars supporting the ceiling and partly an upper floor (perhaps functions as the royal bodyguard's armoury and quarters, cf. 1 Kings 10:17; Isaiah  22:8).

Verse 4
There were windows with beveled frames in three rows, and window was opposite window in three tiers.
"Windows" from Hebrew: , the same word as in 1 Kings 6:4 denoting "beams" or "lattices" ("beam layers" according to Keil;  in Septuagint). They were arranged in "three rows" (or "tiers"), probably referring to 'three stories formed by the three rows of beams', so that the side chambers had 'their windows exactly vis-a-vis in each of the three stories' (as explained by Josephus: , "windows in three divisions" in Ant., 7:05.2).

The interior decoration of the Temple (7:13–51)

The big structures and furnishings in the temple of Solomon were crafted by a Phoenician craftsman called Hiram (or Ahiram), especially the two pillars which stood at the entrance to the temple (verses 15–22), and the circular bronze sea ("molten sea"; verses 23–26), among those listed in verses 40–47. A note states that Solomon established his own ore-refinery in the Jordan valley to produce the necessary bronze material.  Other holy instruments and royal blessing-gifts were richly covered with gold (verses 48–51).

Verses 13–14

 And King Solomon sent and brought Hiram from Tyre.
 He was the son of a widow of the tribe of Naphtali, and his father was a man of Tyre, a worker in bronze. And he was full of wisdom, understanding, and skill for making any work in bronze. He came to King Solomon and did all his work.
"Hiram from Tyre: called "Huram-abi" in 2 Chronicles 2:13, not to be confused with the Phoenician king in 1 Kings 5. Spelled as "Hiram Abiff, he becomes the central character of an allegory presented to all candidates during the third degree in Freemasonry.

Verse 21And he set up the pillars in the porch of the temple: and he set up the right pillar, and called the name thereof Jachin: and he set up the left pillar, and called the name thereof Boaz.These two pillars most likely were not support structures, but were free standing, based on similar pillars in other nearby contemporary temples.

Verse 23

 And he made a molten sea, ten cubits from the one brim to the other: it was round all about, and his height was five cubits: and a line of thirty cubits did compass it round about.Cross reference: 2 Chronicles 4:2
 "5 cubits": a length measurement of about 7.5 feet or 2.3 meters.
 "30 cubits": about 45 feet or 14 meters.
The approximation of the mathematical constant "" ("pi"), defined as the ratio of a circle's circumference to its diameter, can apparently be calculated from this verse as 30 cubits divided by 10 cubits to yield "3". Using gematria, qaweh yields "111" whereas qaw'' yields "106", so when used in calculation  it results in  =  "3.1415094", very close to the modern definition of "3.1415926".

See also

Related Bible parts: 2 Samuel 7, 1 Kings 5, 1 Kings 6, 2 Chronicles 3, 2 Chronicles 4

Notes

References

Sources

External links
 Jewish translations:
 Melachim I - I Kings - Chapter 7 (Judaica Press). Hebrew text and English translation [with Rashi's commentary] at Chabad.org
 Christian translations:
 Online Bible at GospelHall.org (ESV, KJV, Darby, American Standard Version, Bible in Basic English)
 1 Kings chapter 7. Bible Gateway

07
Phoenicians in the Hebrew Bible